Aaron Smith (born 10 September 1982) is a former professional rugby league footballer. He played for the Castleford Tigers (Heritage No. 826), Bradford Bulls, Whitehaven, Leigh Centurions (Heritage No. 1298) and Sheffield Eagles.

Having won Super League VIII, Bradford played against 2003 NRL Premiers, the Penrith Panthers in the 2004 World Club Challenge.

He has previously played for the Leigh Centurions.

References

1982 births
Living people
Bradford Bulls players
Castleford Tigers players
English rugby league players
Leigh Leopards players
Place of birth missing (living people)
Rugby league hookers
Rugby league locks
Sheffield Eagles players
Whitehaven R.L.F.C. players